The Hubert H. Humphrey School of Public Affairs is a public policy and planning school at the University of Minnesota, a public land-grant research university in the Twin Cities of Minneapolis and Saint Paul, Minnesota. It is named after Hubert H. Humphrey, former Vice President of the United States and presidential candidate. The school is located on the West Bank of the University of Minnesota, which is also home to the University of Minnesota Law School and Carlson School of Management in Minneapolis. The Humphrey School is accredited by the Network of Schools of Public Policy, Affairs, and Administration (NASPAA).

History
The University of Minnesota's graduate program for public policy was founded on the East Bank campus in 1938 as the Public Administration Center. In 1968, it achieved autonomy as a graduate school within the university and became the School of Public Affairs. The School was replaced in 1977 with the founding of the Humphrey Institute of Public Affairs, named to honor former Vice President Hubert Humphrey for his contributions to improving the well-being of humanity. It was renamed the Humphrey School of Public Affairs in 2011 to better reflect its academic mission.

Academics
Degrees offered at the Humphrey School include:

Master of Public Policy (MPP) (with degree concentrations in Advanced Policy Analysis Methods, Economic and Community Development, Global Public Policy, Human Rights, Politics and Governance, Public Finance and Budgeting, Public and Nonprofit Leadership Management, Science Technology and Environmental Policy, Social Policy, and Gender Public Policy.)
Mid-career Master of Public Affairs (MPA)
Master of Urban and Regional Planning (MURP)
Master of Science in Science, Technology, and Environmental Policy (MS-STEP)
Master of Development Practice (MDP) 
Master of Human Rights (MHR) 
Ph.D in Public Policy
Dual degrees are offered with the Carlson School of Management (M.B.A.), University of Minnesota Law School (Juris Doctor), Social Work (M.S.W.), University of Minnesota School Public Health (Master of Public Health) and the departments of Architecture and Landscape Architecture (Master of Landscape Architecture) and Civil Engineering (Master of Science in Civil Engineering)
Graduate certificates are offered in Early Childhood Policy, Election Administration, Nonprofit Management, Public Affairs Leadership, Human Services Leadership, and Policy Issues on Work and Pay

The Humphrey School of Public Affairs offers fellowships for Peace Corps volunteers and waives the application fee for the fellowships.

Rankings
Humphrey School is ranked 8th in the United States among America's top public affairs schools by U.S. News & World Report in 2016.
U.S. News & World Report also ranks Minnesota Humphrey as:
2nd in Non Profit Management
11th in social policy
17th in public policy analysis
18th in public management administration
19th in city management and urban policy

Research centers
Center for Science, Technology, and Environmental Policy
Center for the Study of Politics and Governance
Center on Women, Gender, and Public Policy
Freeman Center for International Economic Policy
Public and Nonprofit Leadership Center
Roy Wilkins Center for Human Relations and Social Justice
State and Local Policy Program
Center for Integrative Leadership
Human Capital Research Collaborative

Notable current and former Humphrey school faculty and instructors 

 J. Brian Atwood, former Administrator of United States Agency for International Development (USAID) (1993–2000)
 Robert H. Bruininks, Professor Emeritus and 15th President of the University of Minnesota (2002–2011)
 Harlan Cleveland, former U.S. Ambassador to NATO
 Lawrence R. Jacobs, leading public intellectual and founder of the Center for the Study of Politics and Governance
 James E. Jernberg, Professor Emeritus
 Geri M. Joseph, former U.S. Ambassador to the Netherlands
 Morris Kleiner, AFL–CIO Chair in Labor Policy
 Barbara Lukermann, pioneer in urban planning
 Eric Magnuson, former Chief Justice of the Minnesota Supreme Court
 Walter F. Mondale, 42nd Vice President of the United States (1977–1981)
 Nancy Eustis, Professor Emerita, Aging and Gerontology, retired 2010, affiliated with University of Minnesota Schools of Public Health and Sociology, Co-Editor historic Aging and Disabilities, 1992 Issue of Aging Series of Generations
 R.T. Rybak, former Mayor of Minneapolis (2002–2014) and Vice Chair of the Democratic National Committee
 Eric P. Schwartz, former dean of the Humphrey School of Public Affairs and former U.S. Assistant Secretary of State for Population, Refugees, and Migration
 John Brandl, former dean of the Humphrey School of Public Affairs and DFL Minnesota state senator

References

External links
 Official website

University of Minnesota
Public policy schools
1977 establishments in Minnesota